Covers is a compilation album by American alternative metal band Deftones. The album was released by Warner Bros. Records as a limited edition release for Record Store Day on April 16, 2011. It was distributed exclusively in a vinyl record format, limited to 5,000 copies.

As the title suggests, Covers is a compilation of cover songs—many of which were previously released on B-Sides & Rarities (2005) and the digital version of Diamond Eyes (2010). Deftones record cover songs after each album recording session, and the songs on Covers span their entire career up to that point. The cover of Lynyrd Skynyrd's "Simple Man" was recorded before the group's debut album Adrenaline (1995) when vocalist Chino Moreno was about 17 years old.

Track listing
 "Drive" (originally by the Cars) - 4:49
 "Caress" (originally by Drive Like Jehu) - 3:34
 "Please, Please, Please, Let Me Get What I Want" (originally by the Smiths) - 2:06
 "No Ordinary Love" (originally by Sade) - 5:30
 "Savory (feat. Far)" (originally by Jawbox) - 4:37
 "Do You Believe" (originally by the Cardigans) - 3:28
 "Simple Man" (originally by Lynyrd Skynyrd) - 6:22
 "Ghosts" (originally by Japan) - 4:29
 "The Chauffeur" (originally by Duran Duran) - 5:25
 "If Only Tonight We Could Sleep" (Live) (originally by the Cure) - 5:06
 "Sleep Walk" (originally by Santo & Johnny) - 2:29

References

2011 compilation albums
Deftones albums
Warner Records albums
Record Store Day releases
Covers albums